The following is a list of Sites of Special Scientific Interest in the Edinburgh and West Lothian Area of Search, in Scotland.

 Agassiz Rock, Blackford Quarry
 Arthur's Seat
 Balerno Common
 Blawhorn Moss
 Calderwood
 Carriber Glen
 Cobbinshaw Moss
 Cobbinshaw Reservoir
 Craigengar
 Duddingston Loch
 East Kirkton Quarry
 Firth of Forth
 Hermand Birchwood
 Hermand Quarry
 Inchmickery
 Linhouse Valley
 Linlithgow Loch
 Lochcote Marsh
 Petershill
 Philpstoun Muir
 Skolie Burn
 Tailend Moss
 Wester Craiglockhart Hill

See also
 List of SSSIs by Area of Search

 
Edinburgh and West Lothian
Sites of Special Scientific Interest
Sites of Special Scientific Interest